Joseph McGurn (2 January 1965 – 15 August 2017) was a Scottish footballer who played as a forward.

McGurn played the bulk of his senior career with St Johnstone making 63 appearances for the Perth club. He then had short spells with Alloa Athletic and Stenhousemuir before moving to the juniors with East Kilbride Thistle.

McGurn died on 15 August 2017 at the age of 52 having fought cancer.

References

1965 births
2017 deaths
Alloa Athletic F.C. players
Association football forwards
Deaths from cancer in Scotland
East Kilbride Thistle F.C. players
Scottish footballers
Footballers from Hamilton, South Lanarkshire
St Johnstone F.C. players
Stenhousemuir F.C. players
Scottish Football League players
Place of death missing
Scottish Junior Football Association players